The North Yorkshire police, fire and crime commissioner is the police and crime commissioner, an elected official responsible for overseeing how crime and community safety are tackled, and for providing services for victims of crime, holding North Yorkshire Police to account in the English County of North Yorkshire. 

The post was created in November 2012, following an election held on 15 November 2012, and replaced the North Yorkshire Police Authority.

On 15 November 2018, Police and Crime Commissioner Julia Mulligan became the North Yorkshire police, fire & crime commissioner, taking over the governance of North Yorkshire Fire and Rescue Service.

Commissioner Philip Allott of the Conservative Party was elected on 13 May 2021 and replaced Julia Mulligan. He resigned on 15 October 2021 following comments surrounding the murder of Sarah Everard.

The incumbent commissioner is Zoë Metcalfe of the Conservative Party, who was elected in the 25 November 2021 by-election.

List of office holders

Elections

As the North Yorkshire Authority contest involved only two candidates, a traditional 'first-past-the-post' system was implemented. In all the police crime commissioners' elections in 2012, North Yorkshire had the highest percentage (7.2%) of spoiled or rejected ballots.

Region totals for eliminated candidates were not available and at time of retrieval, only some of the electoral authorities had results from 2016 available online.

References

External links

 

Police and crime commissioners in England